Chodorow may refer to:
 Chodorów, the Polish name of Khodoriv, Galicia, now Ukraine

 Surname
 Jeffrey Chodorow (born 1950), American restaurateur and financier
 Marvin Chodorow (1913–2005),  American physicist
 Nancy Chodorow, American feminist sociologist and psychoanalyst
 Stanley Chodorow, historian and academic administrator

See also 
 Related surnames
  (Khodorovsky)
 Khodorkovsky
 Jodorowsky (surname)

Slavic-language surnames
Jewish surnames
Surnames of Ukrainian origin
Surnames of Polish origin